George Robathan (18 July 1878 – 3 August 1951) was an English cricketer. He played for Gloucestershire in 1922.

References

1878 births
1951 deaths
Sportspeople from Brighton
English cricketers
Gloucestershire cricketers
Glamorgan cricketers
Monmouthshire cricketers